Kamendin is part of the village of Sirig, Serbia. It is located in the Temerin municipality, South Bačka District, Vojvodina province.

History

In the 16th century, Kamendin was a separate settlement and according to the 1590 data, its population numbered 13 Serb houses.

See also
Sirig
Temerin

References
Đorđe Randelj, Novi Sad - slobodan grad, Novi Sad, 1997.

External links
Municipality of Temerin

Temerin
Populated places in South Bačka District
Places in Bačka